Juozas Lebednykas is a Lithuanian artist and sculptor.

The art critic Virginijus Kinčinaitis  said of his work:

Biography
Juozas Lebednykas was born in 1947 in Dusmenys Village, Lithuania.

From 1966 to 1972 he studied sculpture at the State Institute of Art (in 1989 renamed to Vilnius Academy of Art). His tutors were Bronius Vyšniauskas, Gediminas Jokūbonis and Konstantinas Bogdanas. After graduation, from 1972 to 1973 he worked at the Vilnius Monument Restoration Institute and served in the army.

Since 1973 he has lived and worked in Panevėžys. From 1974 to 1987 he worked as a teacher of art at the Panevėžys art school.

He has been a member of the Lithuanian Artists' Union since 1975. During the period from 1989 to 1993 he was elected chairman of the Panevėžys branch of the Lithuanian Artists' Union.

He created numerous copper sheet reliefs and sculptures for interior and exterior as commissioned by the public institutions, as well as small sculpture and ceramic sculpture pieces, plastic compositions, objects and pastels.

Solo exhibitions
 1977 Exhibition Plastic Compositions. Lithuanian Art Foundation, Vilnius
 1992 Exhibition of sculpture and plastic compositions. Panevėžys Art Gallery
 1993 Exhibition of Small Plastic works and Drawings. Gallery XX, Panevėžys
 1993 Exhibition of Sculpture plastic compositions. St.Jonas str. Gallery, Vilnius
 1994 Exhibition of Small Plastic works. Gallery of Medals, Vilnius
 Pastel Works, Panevėžys Art Gallery
 1995 Exhibition of Small Plastic works. Germed Gallery, Berlin, Germany
 1997 Exhibition of Sculpture and Drawings. Panevėžys Civic Art Gallery
 Exhibition of Sculpture and Drawings. Arka Gallery, Vilnius
 1998 Exhibition of sculpture and drawings. J.Miltinis Drama Theatre, Panevėžys
 2000 Exhibition of Sculpture plastic compositions. Gallery „Kauno langas“, Kaunas
 2001 Exhibition of Sculpture. Panevėžys Civic Art Gallery
 2002 Exhibition of Sculpture plastic compositions. Panevėžys Civic Art Gallery
 Exhibition of Sculpture plastic compositions. Gallery of Medals, Vilnius
 2003 Exhibition of Sculpture plastic compositions. Bikuskis Manor
 Small form sculpture, Academy of Sciences of the RofL, Vilnius
 2005 Exhibition of Sculpture plastic compositions. Laiptai Gallery, Šiauliai
 2007 Exhibition of Sculpture plastic compositions. Panevėžys Art Gallery

Group exhibitions
 1973 The Second National Exhibition of Young Artists' Work. Čiurlionis Art Museum, Kaunas
 1974 The Third National Exhibition of Young Artists'Work. Art Palace, Panevėžys
 1975 Exhibition „Our Country“. Art Palace, Vilnius
 1976 National Exhibition of Young Artists' Work. Art Palace, Vilnius
 1983 National Sculpture Exhibition. Art Palace, Vilnius
 1974-1990 Spring Exhibition of the Panevėžys Artists' Work. Panevėžys Art Palace, Panevėžys Art Gallery
 1992 Exhibition of Lithuanian Sculpture. Abenraa, Denmark
 1995 7th Panevėžys International ceramic symposium exhibition. Panevėžys Civic Art Gallery
 Exhibition „1995: Art in Lithuania“. Contemporary Art Center, Vilnius
 1996 Exhibition of the Panevėžys Artists' Work. Art Exhibition Palace, Klaipėda
 1998 Exhibition of the Panevėžys Artist's Work. Kėdainiai Town Hall Art Gallery
 Exhibition „Panevėžys Art –30“. Panevėžys Civic Art Gallery
 Exhibition of artist's group "Plekšne". Arka Gallery, Vilnius
 1999 Exhibition of artist’s group „Plekšne“. Gallery of Medals, Vilnius
 11th Panevėžys International ceramic symposium exhibition. Panevėžys Civic Art Gallery
 Exhibition "Lithuanian Ceramics". Schloss Ort castle, Gmunden, Austria
 Panevėžys Art Days in Vilnius. Artists Palace, Vilnius
 2000 Exhibition "Chamber Sculpture". Gallery of Medals, Vilnius
 "Arka" 10th anniversary exhibition. Arka Gallery, Vilnius
 "Panevėžys Civic Art Gallery Ceramic Collection 1989-1999". Panevėžys Civic Art Gallery
 2001 Lithuanian Collection of the ceramics generated during the Panevėžys
 International ceramic symposiums. Arka Gallery, Vilnius
 Exhibition of Works of the Lithuanian Sculptors. The President's Office Gardens, Vilnius
 13th Panevėžys International ceramic symposium exhibition. Panevėžys Civic Art Gallery
 Exhibition of Works of the Lithuanian Sculptors. Birštonas Local Government Building
 Exhibition of Photographs of Monuments as Tombstones. Gallery of Medals, Vilnius
 Gallery of Medals 10th anniversary exhibition. Gallery of Medals, Vilnius
 2002 Sculpture exhibition "Bronze Metamorphoses". Gallery of Medals, Vilnius
 Exhibition "10x10". Gallery XX, Panevėžys
 Exhibition "New creation". Gallery of Medals, Vilnius
 "Collection' 2002" fine arts review arranged by the Lithuanian Artists Union, Šiauliai Art Gallery
 2003 Exhibition-contest "Sculpture Gardens of Bernardins", St.John's Gallery, Vilnius
 Exhibition "Panevėžys Art Days'2003". Panevėžys Civic Art Gallery
 Exhibition of Lithuanian ceramics "Paraphrases". Hacettepe University Art Gallery, Turkey
 Ceramic Collection of Panevėžys Civic Art Gallery. The President's Office Gardens, Vilnius
 2004 Exhibition of the Panevėžys Artists' Work. LDS Gallery, Kaunas
 15th Panevėžys International ceramic symposium exhibition. Panevėžys Civic Art Gallery
 National exhibition "SPACE- monumental art-architecture". Arka Gallery, Vilnius
 2005 Exhibition of the Panevėžys Artists' Work. LDS Gallery, Klaipėda
 Exhibition "Panevėžys Art Days'2005". Panevėžys Civic Art Gallery
 Exhibition of the Panevėžys Artists' Work "Panevėžys – Vilnius". Arka Gallery, Vilnius
 Project "Clay on Clay"(KLAAI OP KLAAI). Exhibition "Selected works of Panevėžys
 "International Ceramic Symposiums". Groate Kerk St. Jacobiparochie, Het Bildt, The Netherlands
 Contemporary Art of Aukštaitija. Panevėžys Civic Art Gallery
 2006 Exhibition "SPACE 1990-2005. Monumental art". Panevėžys Civic Art Gallery
 Exhibition of the Panevėžys Artists' Work "Panevėžys – Jelgava". G. Eliasa museum of art and history, Jelgava, Latvia
 National exhibition of graphic arts and sculpture "Space – plane – body". Contemporary Art Center, Vilnius
 2007 Exhibition "Selected works of the Panevezys International Ceramic Symposiums", Lithuanian Center, the Lithuanian Embassy in Poland, Warsaw, Poland

Symposiums, Pleinairs
 1995 7th Panevėžys International Ceramic Symposium
 1999 11th Panevėžys International Ceramic Symposium
 2000 International Ice Sculpture Symposium, Jelgava, Latvia
 2001 1st International Pleinair. Ecological –educational actions „Vision of Metal“, Onuškis, Lithuania
 13th Panevėžys International Ceramic Symposium
 5th bronze symposium. Foundry "Bronze Age" of the Lithuanian Artists Union, Vilnius
 2004 15th Panevėžys International Ceramic Symposium

Sculptures in public spaces
 Sculpture on the grave of actor Bronius Babkauskas (architect R. Eigelis). 1976, granite, 210x70 cm, Graveyard of the Christ the King Cathedral, Ramygalos Str., Panevėžys
 Birds (architect R. Vyšniauskas). 1985, copper, 645x150 cm, Front yard of the Panevėžys Water Supply and Sewer organization (in 1995 renamed to Joint Stock Company „Aukštaitijos vandenys“ (Aukštaitija Waters)
 Spring. 1986, copper, 190x100 cm, Interior of the Panevėžys Water Supply and Sewer organization office building (in 1995 renamed to Joint Stock Company „Aukštaitijos vandenys“ (Aukštaitija Waters)
 Waiting. 1987, copper, 170x70 cm, Panevėžys Land Museum
 Tranquility. 1987, copper, 137x50 cm, Panevėžys Land Museum
 Sails (architect M. Steponavičius). 1988, copper, 270x100 cm, Panevėžys Local Government Building
 Pieta (architect V. Andriuška). 1990, copper, granite, 400x80 cm, Churchyard of the Panevėžys Holy Trinity church
 Snail (architect A. Barzdžiukas). 1995, granite, 120x80 cm, Exterior of the Lithuanian Savings Bank Panevėžys office
 Monument to participants of the 1863 year uprising (architect A. Beresnevičius). 1998, granite, 280x176x120 cm, Uprising square, Panevėžys
 Tranquility. 1999, copper, 180x50 cm, Vytauto str., Palanga
 Blossom (architect R. Lukšas). 1999, copper, 120x120 cm, Urbšio str. Panevėžys
 Monument to St. Roch in Onuškis township. 2004, stoneware, metal, 450x80x80 cm, Onuškis, central square

References

1947 births
Living people
People from Trakai District Municipality
Lithuanian artists
Vilnius Academy of Arts alumni